Jean-Baptiste Joseph René Poulain ( ? — Héros, off Trafalgar, 21 October 1805) was a French Navy officer.

Career 
As a Commander, he captained the 74-gun Héros. He took part in the Battle of Trafalgar, where he was mortally wounded at 13:15. Lieutenant Conor replaced him as captain of Héros.

Notes and references

Notes

References

Bibliography 
 Fonds Marine. Campagnes (opérations ; divisions et stations navales ; missions diverses). Inventaire de la sous-série Marine BB4. Tome deuxième : BB4 1 à 482 (1790-1826) 

French naval commanders of the Napoleonic Wars
1805 deaths
Year of birth unknown
French military personnel killed in the Napoleonic Wars